Beşir Atalay (born 1947) is a Turkish politician who was Deputy Prime Minister of Turkey in the government of Recep Tayyip Erdoğan from 2011 to 2014. Previously he was minister of interior from 28 August 2007 to 14 July 2011.

Early years and academic career
Born in Keskin, Kırıkkale Province, he graduated from the Faculty of Law at Ankara University and worked as a lecturer at Atatürk University in Erzurum. He then worked at the State Planning Organization (DPT), Marmara University, and UNESCO's Turkish National Commission. Atalay was the founding rector of the Kırıkkale University until he was removed from office by the Board of Higher Education (YÖK) in the aftermath of the Turkish military memorandum of 1997, on grounds he was involved in activities contrary to the interests of the state.

Political career
In the General Elections of 2002, he was elected a member of the Grand National Assembly of Turkey representing Ankara for the AKP and later he became a minister of state in Erdoğan's first cabinet following President Ahmet Necdet Sezer's veto of a proposal to appoint Atalay as minister of education. Then in August 2007 he was appointed interior minister, one of the few cabinet changes following the re-election of Prime Minister Recep Tayyip Erdoğan that summer, and also following Sezer's retirement from the presidency. In 2009, he was assigned with the task to find a solution to the Turkish Kurdish conflict, a project which lasted until December 2009 and was not supported by the Republican People's Party (CHP) and the Nationalist Movement Party (MHP). In 2011, he was named deputy prime minister with the responsibility of human rights and the fight against terrorism and served in the post until 2014. He was re-elected to the Turkish Parliament in the general elections of November 2015, this time representing the province of Van for the AKP, but did not stand as a candidate in 2018.

Personal life
Beşir Atalay is married to Yıldız Atalay and has three children. He is a member of the Community of İskenderpaşa, a Turkish sufistic community of Naqshbandi tariqah.

Notes

References
 Biyografi.net - Biography of Beşir Atalay

|-

1947 births
Ankara University Faculty of Law alumni
Deputy Prime Ministers of Turkey
Government ministers of Turkey
Living people
Ministers of the Interior of Turkey
People from Keskin
Members of the 26th Parliament of Turkey
Members of the 24th Parliament of Turkey
Members of the 23rd Parliament of Turkey
Members of the 22nd Parliament of Turkey
Naqshbandi order
Deputies of Kırıkkale
Ministers of State of Turkey
Members of the 60th government of Turkey